α-Amyrin synthase (2,3-oxidosqualene alpha-amyrin cyclase, mixed amyrin synthase) is an enzyme with systematic name (3S)-2,3-epoxy-2,3-dihydrosqualene mutase (cyclizing, alpha-amyrin-forming). This enzyme catalyses the following chemical reaction

 (3S)-2,3-epoxy-2,3-dihydrosqualene  alpha-amyrin

This multifunctional enzyme produces both alpha- and beta-amyrin.

References

External links 
 

EC 5.4.99